is an underground metro station located in Minato-ku, Nagoya, Aichi, Japan operated by the Nagoya Municipal Subway’s Meikō Line. It is currently a terminal station on the line, and is located 6.0 kilometers from the opposing terminus of the Meikō Line at Kanayama Station. This station provides access to the Port of Nagoya Public Aquarium and Nagoya Port.

History
Nagoyakō Station was opened on 29 March 1971.

Lines

 (Station E07)

Station layout
Nagoyakō Station has a single underground island platform.

Platforms

There are three exits: Exit 1 and Exit 2 on the South Exit facing the port, and Exit 3 on the North Exit facing the Meikō Line. Correspondingly, there are also two rows of gates. The North Exit has bathrooms, a telephone, and down escalator. The South Exit has an up escalator, lockers, and an elevator. Exit 2 of the North Exit provides closest access to the bus rotary.

References

External links

 Nagoyakō Station's web page at the Nagoya Transportation Bureau's web site 

Railway stations in Japan opened in 1971
Railway stations in Aichi Prefecture
Stations of Nagoya Municipal Subway